Maltol is a naturally occurring organic compound that is used primarily as a flavor enhancer.  It is found in the bark of larch tree, in pine needles, and in roasted malt (from which it gets its name).  It is a white crystalline powder that is soluble in hot water, chloroform, and other polar solvents.  Because it has the odor of cotton candy and caramel, maltol is used to impart a sweet aroma to fragrances.  Maltol's sweetness adds to the odor of freshly baked bread, and is used as a flavor enhancer (INS number 636) in breads and cakes.

Maltol, like related 3-hydroxy-4-pyrones such as kojic acid, binds to hard metal centers such as Fe3+, Ga3+, Al3+, and VO2+.  Related to this property, maltol has been reported to greatly increase aluminum uptake in the body and to increase the oral bioavailability of gallium and iron.
It is known in the European E number food additive series as E636.

See also
 Ethyl maltol
 Ferric maltol
 Gallium maltolate
 5-Hydroxymaltol
 Isomaltol

References

Flavors
Food additives
Flavor enhancers
4-Pyrones
Enols
Sweet-smelling chemicals